Tiachiv Raion is a raion in Zakarpattia Oblast in western Ukraine. Its administrative center is Tiachiv. Population: 

On 18 July 2020, as part of the administrative reform of Ukraine, the number of raions of Zakarpattia Oblast was reduced to six, and the area of Tiachiv Raion was significantly expanded.  The January 2020 estimate of the raion population was 

Romanian became in September 2012 a regional language in the village of Bila Tserkva; meaning it was allowed to be used in the towns administrative office work and documents. This was made possible after new legislation on languages in Ukraine was passed in the summer of 2012. The Constitutional Court of Ukraine on 28 February 2018 ruled this legislation unconstitutional.

The raion has one city: Tiachiv, and five urban-type settlements: Bushtyno, Dubove, Solotvyno, Teresva and Ust-Chorna.

See also
 Administrative divisions of Zakarpattia Oblast

References

Raions of Zakarpattia Oblast
Romanian-speaking countries and territories
1946 establishments in Ukraine